Faruk Çelik (born 17 January 1956) is a Turkish politician and a Member of Parliament for Bursa of the ruling Justice and Development Party. He served in various ministerial roles from 2009 to 2017, most recently as the Minister of Work and Social Security. He was the Minister of Food, Agriculture and Livestock.

Previously he had been a teacher and a businessman. One of the leading members of the Justice and Development Party, he was made parliamentary group leader upon his election as an MP in 2002. He was made Minister of Work in 2007.

References

Living people
1956 births
Government ministers of Turkey
Deputies of Şanlıurfa
Justice and Development Party (Turkey) politicians
Ministers of Labour and Social Security of Turkey
Deputies of Bursa
Members of the 65th government of Turkey
Members of the 64th government of Turkey
Members of the 26th Parliament of Turkey
Members of the 24th Parliament of Turkey
Members of the 23rd Parliament of Turkey
Members of the 22nd Parliament of Turkey
Members of the 21st Parliament of Turkey
Ministers of State of Turkey
Members of the 60th government of Turkey